Gladestony Estevão Paulino da Silva (born 5 August 1993), simply known as Gladestony, is a Brazilian footballer who plays as a central midfielder for Italian  club Giugliano.

Club career
Born in Bebedouro, São Paulo, Gladestony started his career at Santos in 2008, but moved to Desportivo Brasil in the following year, as a part of a partnership with Manchester United. After a year at Icasa, he moved to the English powerhouse, being subsequently loaned to FC Twente; he was also close friends with Paul Pogba during his spell at the Red Devils.

On 21 September 2012, Gladestony joined São Paulo, being promoted to the main squad in February the following year. He left the club on 5 July 2013, after making no senior appearances, and signed for Estoril Praia.

After being rarely used (only one UEFA Europa League and one Taça de Portugal match), Gladestony returned to his home country in December, and signed a one-year deal with Internacional. He made his Série A debut on 27 April 2014, coming on as a second-half substitute for Alan Patrick in a 2–2 away draw against Botafogo.

On 13 July 2015, Gladestony returned to Estoril, after agreeing to a two-year deal. After being released by Catania on 17 November 2017, he joined Pro Vercelli on 3 January 2018.

On 13 July 2019, he signed a 2-year contract with Siena.

On 11 August 2020 he joined Serie D club Seregno.

On 5 August 2021, he moved to Giugliano, also in Serie D. Giugliano was promoted to Serie C for the 2022–23 season.

References

External links
 
 

1993 births
Living people
People from Bebedouro
Brazilian footballers
Association football midfielders
Campeonato Brasileiro Série A players
Campeonato Brasileiro Série B players
Associação Desportiva Recreativa e Cultural Icasa players
São Paulo FC players
Sport Club Internacional players
Clube Atlético Bragantino players
Grêmio Osasco Audax Esporte Clube players
Manchester United F.C. players
FC Twente players
G.D. Estoril Praia players
FC Cartagena footballers
Catania S.S.D. players
A.C.R. Messina players
F.C. Pro Vercelli 1892 players
A.C.N. Siena 1904 players
U.S. 1913 Seregno Calcio players
S.S.C. Giugliano players
Serie C players
Serie D players
Brazilian expatriate footballers
Brazilian expatriate sportspeople in England
Expatriate footballers in England
Brazilian expatriate sportspeople in the Netherlands
Expatriate footballers in the Netherlands
Brazilian expatriate sportspeople in Portugal
Expatriate footballers in Portugal
Brazilian expatriate sportspeople in Spain
Expatriate footballers in Spain
Expatriate footballers in Italy
Footballers from São Paulo (state)